Jensens Bøfhus ("Jensen's Beef House") is a Danish steakhouse chain consisting of 33 restaurants (September 2018); 23 in Denmark, 8 in Sweden and 2 in Norway.

It started in the year of 1984 when Palle Skov Jensen opened the first restaurant which was then called Bøfhus España in Aarhus, Denmark. The name was changed to the current in 1990 and at that point there were only four restaurants. It unsuccessfully attempted to expand to Germany by opening a restaurant in Lübeck but withdrew from the endeavour in 2016.

Public opinion turned against Jensen's in Denmark after the company pursued and won a legal battle against a small fish restaurant which they claimed unrightfully used their brand.

In 2018 multiple restaurants in Denmark were shut down due to excessive losses in fiscal year 2017.

As of late 2018 the chain is still owned by Palle Skov Jensen.

References

External links 
 Official webpage

Restaurants established in 1984
Restaurant chains in Denmark
Steakhouses
Companies based in Odense Municipality
1984 establishments in Denmark